Michael William Horan (born February 1, 1959) is a former professional American football punter. He played college football at Long Beach State and was drafted in the ninth round (235th overall) by the Atlanta Falcons of the National Football League (NFL).

Although Horan played for five different teams during his career, he is best known for having punted for the Denver Broncos during their Super Bowl runs of the 1980s, and with the St. Louis Rams in their Super Bowl XXXIV victory over the Tennessee Titans (this was also his last NFL game). He tied the career record for most punts in Super Bowls with 17 total.

He was selected to the Pro Bowl after the 1988 season, and named All-Pro, in which he had a 37.8 net average. He was known for his coffin corner punts.

College career
Horan attended Sunny Hills High School, after graduating, he attended Fullerton College before transferring to Long Beach State.

In 1980, Horan appeared in 11 games. He recorded 58 punts for 2,369 yards. In 1981, he appeared in 10 games. He recorded 63 punts for 2,816 yards. He was named to the All-PCAA team.

In 2008, Horan was inducted to the Fullerton College Athletic Hall of Fame.

Career statistics

Professional career

Early career
Horan was selected in the ninth round (235th overall) of the 1982 NFL Draft by the Atlanta Falcons, however he failed to make the team. The next year, he was signed by the Green Bay Packers, but failed his physical. He then spent time with the Buffalo Bills.

In 1984, Horan appeared in 16 games. He recorded 92 punts for 3,880 yards, with 21 inside the 20, and six touchbacks. In 1985, he appeared in 16 games. He recorded 91 punts for 3,777 yards, with 20 inside the 20 and 10 touchbacks. On August 29, 1986, he was released by the Eagles. He then spent a short amount of time with the Minnesota Vikings.

Denver Broncos
Horan then signed with the Denver Broncos after head coach Dan Reeves was informed by then New York Giants head coach Bill Parcells that Horan could potentially help the Broncos, who had already used two punters during the season.

In his first season with the Broncos, Horan appeared in the final four games of the season. He recorded 21 punts for 864 yards, with eight inside the 20, and two touchbacks. In 1987, he appeared in 12 games. He recorded 44 punts for 1,807 yards, with 11 inside the 20, and five touchbacks. In 1988, he appeared in 16 games. He recorded 65 punts for 2,861 yards, with 19 inside the 20 and one touchback. For his performance, he was named to the Pro Bowl. In 1989, he appeared in 16 games. He recorded 77 punts for 3,111 yards, with 24 inside the 20 and five touchbacks. In 1990, he appeared in 15 games. He recorded 58 punts for 2,575 yards, with 14 inside the 20 and six touchbacks. In 1991, he appeared in 16 games. He recorded 72 punts for 3,012 yards, with 24 inside the 20 and eight touchbacks. In 1992, he appeared in seven games. He recorded 37 punts for 1,681 yards, with seven inside the 20 and one touchback, before suffering a major knee injury that ended his season.

In August 1993, he was released by the Denver Broncos.

Later career
On November 10, 1993, Horan signed with the New York Giants after the team waived punter Sean Landeta. For the season, he appeared in eight games. He recorded 44 punts for 1,882 yards, with 13 inside the 20 and one touchback. On July 23, 1994 he was re-signed by the Giants. For the season, he appeared in 16 games. He recorded 85 punts for 3,521 yards, with 25 inside he 20 and seven touchbacks. In 1995, he appeared in 16 games. He recorded 72 punts for 3,063 yards, with 15 inside the 20 and eight touchbacks. On May 6, 1996, he was re-signed by the Giants. For the season, he appeared in 16 games. He recorded a career high 102 punts for a career high 4,289 yards, with, a career high, 32 inside the 20 and 10 touchbacks.

On October 14, 1997, Horan signed with the St. Louis Rams. For the season, he appeared in 10 games. He recorded 53 punts for 2,272 yards, with 10 inside the 20 and four touchbacks. On September 22, 1998, he signed with the Chicago Bears after Todd Sauerbrun tore his ACL in the third game of the season. For the season, Horan appeared in 13 games. He recorded 64 punts for 2,643 yards, with 12 inside the 20 and four touchbacks. On November 10, 1999 he re-signed with the St. Louis Rams. That season, he appeared in the final eight games of the season. He recorded 26 punts for 1,048 yards, with seven inside the 20 and four touchbacks. The final game of his career was the Rams' victory over the Tennessee Titans in Super Bowl XXXIV.

NFL career statistics

Post-football
After retiring, Horan began giving punting lessions in and around the Los Angeles, California area. In 2005, he appeared in the film Tennis, Anyone...?. In 2011, he attended an event in support of the Rams' return to Los Angeles; the team returned in 2016.

References

External links
 Official website
 Fullerton College Centennial Celebration Alumni Stories
 Long Beach State Hall of Fame bio

1959 births
Living people
Sportspeople from Orange, California
American football punters
Fullerton Hornets football players
Long Beach State 49ers football players
Atlanta Falcons players
Green Bay Packers players
Buffalo Bills players
Philadelphia Eagles players
Minnesota Vikings players
Denver Broncos players
American Conference Pro Bowl players
New York Giants players
St. Louis Rams players
Chicago Bears players